Sean Christopher Avery (born April 10, 1980) is a Canadian former professional ice hockey player. During his career in the National Hockey League (NHL), he played left wing for the Detroit Red Wings, Los Angeles Kings, New York Rangers, and Dallas Stars, gaining recognition for controversial and disrespectful behaviour both on and off the ice. His agitating playing style led to multiple teams waiving him and to having a contract terminated. He led the league in penalty minutes twice, during the 2003–04 and 2005–06 NHL seasons.

After retiring in 2012, Avery focused full-time on working in the creative industry. He has worked in fashion as an intern at Vogue magazine, as a model, and as a restaurateur. Avery's memoir, Ice Capades: A Memoir of Fast Living and Tough Hockey, was published by Blue Rider Press in 2017. He has hosted a weekly podcast, No Gruffs Given with Sean Avery since December of 2019.

Early life
Avery was born in North York, Ontario, the son of Al and Marlene Avery, both teachers. He grew up in Pickering, Ontario, where he attended Dunbarton High School. He has a younger brother named Scott.

Playing career

Junior league (1996–2000)
Prior to joining the NHL, Avery played for the Owen Sound Platers and the Kingston Frontenacs of the Ontario Hockey League (OHL).

Detroit Red Wings (2001–2003)
Avery was signed by the Detroit Red Wings as a free agent in 1999. He played one final season in the OHL before turning professional in 2000 with the Cincinnati Mighty Ducks of the American Hockey League (AHL). Avery first played in the NHL during the 2001–02 season, playing 36 games with the Red Wings and 36 in the minors. The Red Wings went on to win the Stanley Cup that season but Avery did not play in the playoffs  nor did he play the required 41 games to get his name engraved on the Cup.

Midway through the 2002–03 season, Avery was traded to the Los Angeles Kings, along with defenseman Maxim Kuznetsov and two draft picks for Mathieu Schneider. He finished the season with 15 points in 51 games.

Los Angeles Kings and NHL lockout (2003–2007)

In 2003–04, Avery played 76 games for the Kings, scoring 9 goals to go along with 19 assists. He also led the NHL in penalty minutes with 261.

During the 2004–05 NHL lockout, Avery briefly played in the Finnish Elite League with the Lahti Pelicans, and in the United Hockey League for the Motor City Mechanics. Along with 149 penalty minutes in just 16 games, he tallied 26 points for the Mechanics, including two hat tricks, making him the first player in Mechanics history to record two hat tricks in one season. Several players spoke publicly of their dissatisfaction with the NHL Players' Association’s leadership during the lockout, including Avery, who publicly blamed NHLPA president Bob Goodenow for wasting an entire season with a battle that alienated fans and yielded few results.

Avery led the league in penalty minutes for the second consecutive season in 2005-06, with 257. With three games remaining, the Kings unofficially suspended Avery for the remainder of the season after he refused to do a drill in practice. Nevertheless, the team re-signed him to a one-year deal.

During his time with the Kings, Avery has been said to have mocked Dustin Brown about his lisp. Former Kings' teammate Ian Laperrière said it "was bullying, like you might see in high school". But according to other players and coaches, Brown's lisp was not Avery's target; Brown's then girlfriend, now wife, Nicole was. Avery did not think Nicole was glamorous enough to be a "girlfriend of a hockey player in Hollywood."

New York Rangers (2007–2008)

On February 5, 2007, in the middle of the 2006–07 season, Avery was traded to the New York Rangers. After joining the Rangers, he scored 20 points in 29 games to help the team complete a 17–4–6 end-of-season run to qualify for the playoffs. On March 17, Avery recorded a single-game career-high four points (one goal and three assists) against the Boston Bruins in a 7–0 victory. Avery played in his first career playoff game on April 12 against the Atlanta Thrashers, recording his first playoff points with a goal and an assist.

On August 1, 2007, Avery, as a restricted free agent, earned an arbitration award of $1.9 million for the 2007–08 season, which the Rangers accepted.

On February 16, 2008, in a game against the Buffalo Sabres, Avery scored 10 seconds into the game, setting a record for fastest goal scored by a Ranger on home ice.

Dallas Stars (2008)
Avery signed a four-year, $15.5 million contract with the Dallas Stars on July 2, 2008. In December 2008, the NHL suspended Avery after he made controversial remarks about other players dating his ex-girlfriends. After serving a six-game suspension and completing a counseling program, the Stars placed Avery on waivers on February 7, 2009.

Return to the Rangers (2009–2012)

After clearing waivers on February 9, 2009, Avery was assigned to the Hartford Wolf Pack, the Rangers' AHL affiliate, although he remained a member of the Stars organization (that season, the Stars had no AHL affiliate). On March 2, Avery was placed on re-entry waivers by Dallas, and claimed by the Rangers the following day. On January 5, 2010, in a game against the Stars, his former team, Avery recorded one goal and three assists.

On October 4, 2011, the Rangers waived Avery. He later cleared waivers and re-joined the Rangers for their November 5 game against the Montreal Canadiens. After being a healthy scratch for nine games, Avery was once again placed on waivers on December 30, 2011. Since no NHL team claimed him, he returned to the AHL's Connecticut Whale. His last game played with the Whale was on January 27, 2012. He was left off the Whale's Clear Day list of players eligible to play for the remainder of the AHL season submitted on March 5, and told to no longer report to games or practices.

On March 12, 2012, Avery retired. He announced his retirement on Watch What Happens Live with host Andy Cohen.

Orlando Solar Bears (2022)

On February 23, 2022, the Orlando Solar Bears of the ECHL signed Avery to a standard player contract, putting him on the team's reserve list. Orlando released him two days later. Avery did not play in a game for the Solar Bears.

Controversies and bullying
During and after his hockey career, Avery has been involved in a number of controversies. The NHL and his teams have disciplined him multiple times. Outside of hockey, he has a history of bullying co-workers, support staff, and his own mother-in-law. The lack of respect for others started early in his career; Red Wings general manager Ken Holland said he traded Avery during the 2002–03 season  because he did not live up to the standards of an NHL professional. Avery has bullied people including Dustin Brown and Martin Brodeur. One former teammate said of Avery, "He is all smoke and mirrors. He doesn’t have a lot of friends in any line of work."

Leukemia comment
In November 2007, Howard Berger, a reporter for Toronto radio station FAN 590 stated that an unnamed Rangers player had accused Avery of commenting about Toronto Maple Leafs player Jason Blake's battle with leukemia, prior to a pregame confrontation between Avery and Toronto's Darcy Tucker. Avery, who denied the allegation, received an NHL-maximum $2500 fine, and Tucker received a $1000 fine.

The Avery Rule

During Game 3 of the 2008 Eastern Conference Quarter-Finals against the New Jersey Devils, Avery turned his back on the play to face and screen Devils goaltender Martin Brodeur during a two-man advantage on the power play. He waved his hands and stick in front of Brodeur to distract him and block his view. The puck was later cleared out of the Devils' zone but on the second Rangers offensive attack, Avery scored a power play goal.

Notable was that Avery spent the initial part of the play facing Brodeur while ignoring the puck, with his back to the play (normally, the player screening the goaltender is facing the play). The following day, the NHL issued an interpretation of the league's unsportsmanlike conduct rule to cover actions such as the one employed by Avery, which would now result in a minor penalty. This became known colloquially as "The Avery Rule".

Avery's tactics during that series earned multiple power plays, and he scored in each of the first three games. The Rangers won the series in five games.

Heckling incident

On November 1, 2008, following a game with the Stars against the Boston Bruins, Avery was accused of shouting obscenities at a fan who had been heckling him during the game. A report of complaint was filed with the NHL, but no action was taken.

"Sloppy seconds" comment
On December 2, 2008, prior to the Stars' morning skate in preparation for a game against the Calgary Flames, Avery approached the assembled reporters in the dressing room and stated, "I just want to comment on how it's become like a common thing in the NHL for guys to fall in love with my sloppy seconds. I don't know what that's about, but enjoy the game tonight." At the time, two of Avery's ex-girlfriends were dating fellow NHL players: actress Elisha Cuthbert was dating Flames defenceman Dion Phaneuf, and model Rachel Hunter was dating Kings centre Jarret Stoll.

Within hours, the NHL suspended Avery indefinitely for "conduct detrimental to the league or the game of hockey". His comments were met with near-unanimous condemnation by the Stars organization, fellow players, and fans alike. Stars owner Tom Hicks said that the team would have suspended Avery had the NHL not acted first. Avery apologized the next day, calling his actions "inappropriate" and "a bad attempt to build excitement for the game".

On December 5, the NHL fixed Avery's suspension at six games, retroactive to the December 2 game against the Flames. He agreed to undergo anger management counselling due to what the NHL called unacceptable and antisocial behaviour. Commissioner Gary Bettman noted that both he and league disciplinarian Colin Campbell had warned Avery several times before about his behaviour
. On December 14, after the last game of Avery's suspension, the Stars announced that Avery would not return to the team. One factor in the Stars decision was that coach Dave Tippett and several of the players, including Mike Modano and Marty Turco, let it be known they weren't willing to take him back on the team. Tippett had warned Avery not to talk to the media about his former girlfriends, and was outraged when he did so. According to TSN's James Duthie, Avery's teammates soured on him not long after he arrived. The "sloppy seconds" incident was the last straw, and Hicks had been actively looking to cut ties with him while the suspension was underway.

Feud with John Tortorella
Prior to his second stint with the Rangers, Avery had been called out on numerous occasions by then TSN commentator, future Rangers coach, and Stanley Cup winner John Tortorella, who is noted for his no-nonsense behaviour with his players and the press. After rejoining the Rangers, Avery’s relationship with Tortorella was uneasy, although in Avery's book he reports there were moments of mutual admiration. Nearly a year after Avery retired, on March 30, 2013, following the Rangers’ second consecutive shutout loss, Avery posted on his Twitter account about his former coach, "Fire this CLOWN, his players hate him and wont play for his BS." On May 29, 2013, after the Rangers lost to the Bruins in the Eastern Conference semifinals, Tortorella was fired. Avery told the New York Post that he "had a huge smile" on his face after finding out that Tortorella was fired, adding, "It’s not that I’m happy for myself. I’m happy for the Rangers and Ranger fans."

Restraining order and other bullying incidents
In November 2014, Avery suddenly quit an off-Broadway play he was set to star in, Negative Is Positive, two days before the play was set to open. On November 3, Avery abruptly left rehearsals after growing agitated. The following day, he had "a meltdown" when a stage manager asked him if he wanted a slice of pizza, which he reportedly misheard, believing the stage manager had called him an "asshole". According to witnesses for the New York Post, Avery "pretty much snapped" and started yelling at the stage manager before quitting the show, leaving her in tears. Playwright and director Christy Smith-Sloman called it "a complete horror story", describing his conduct as "a playwright's worst nightmare." An understudy filled in for him when the play opened.

In 2016, Avery was served with a restraining order for harassing his mother-in-law. Beginning in summer of 2016, Avery "was harassing her. They were running into each other, belonged to the same gym, and he’d issue profanities at her and make obscene gestures. He was driving in his car too close to her and scaring her."

Criminal mischief trial

In 2019, Avery used his Instagram account to mount "an increasingly brash, occasionally violent crusade" to clear New York City's bike lanes.

After ramming his scooter into a minivan blocking a bike lane in New York City's West Village, Avery was charged with criminal mischief in 2019. Prosecutors offered him a plea deal that would involve him pleading guilty, paying a fine, and attending anger management classes. In an in-person hearing in April 2022, Avery dismissed his lawyer, chose to represent himself, and declined a bench trial, demanding instead a jury trial. His court date was set for May 23, 2022. This angered Avery, who lives and works in California, and who had demanded a trial on the same day as his hearing. At a pretrial hearing on May 23, Avery attended via FaceTime and was represented by an attorney. He was ordered to appear in person on June 15.

Avery tried to use his podcast to rally supporters to attend his trial, although only two were in attendance. On June 16, the second day of his trial, Avery was convicted of attempted criminal mischief, a misdemeanor. He was ordered to pay a $205 surcharge and was barred from contact with his victims for three years.

Advertising

After retiring from the NHL in 2012, Avery began working at Lipman, a New York City-based advertising and creative agency. Avery was said to have "charmed (David) Lipman into giving him a position" and was brought on as the chief strategic officer. Avery helped develop strategies for the company and worked as a model. He also handled a range of assignments for Lipman’s parent company, Revolate Holdings, a "failed brand marketing holding company that had stakes in a number of ventures". During his time at Lipman, Avery was said to have been "terrorizing everyone in the office." According to former co-workers, "He will stop at nothing to get it done, even if there are casualties along the way. He creates conflict and pushes it too far." In August 2013, when Lipman declared bankruptcy, Avery was owed $229,167 for his work.

Fashion

Vogue
In April 2008, it was announced that Avery would spend the summer offseason interning at Vogue magazine. In June 2008, Avery guest-edited Mensvogue.com, the website for Men's Vogue magazine. His interest mainly resides with women's fashion; of men's fashion Avery has said, "You do suits and pants and that's about that. Women's clothes tell a story. That's what's interesting to me."

In 2008, New Line Cinema put into development a film based on Avery’s life, focusing on his status as a professional athlete with an active interest in fashion, including a summer internship at Vogue. Stan Chervin was hired to write the script.

Commonwealth Utilities
In 2009, Avery worked with men's fashion label Commonwealth Utilities to present a clothing line for New York Fashion Week.

Modelling

Hickey Freeman
Avery was hired to be the face of Hickey Freeman's Spring/Summer 2012 ad campaign, shot by Francesco Carrozzini. The print ads appeared in Vanity Fair, DC Modern Luxury, and other magazines. As of 2021, he is no longer working with Hickey Freeman.

7 For All Mankind
Avery was in the 2013 campaign for 7 for All Mankind called A Beautiful Odyssey. He also appeared in print ads.

Film and television appearances
Avery had a small role in the 2005 Maurice Richard biopic The Rocket: The Legend of Rocket Richard, portraying former New York Rangers defenseman Bob Dill.

Avery appeared in a 2007 episode of MADtv with Kings teammates Tom Kostopoulos and Scott Thornton.

He was on People magazine’s Sexiest Man Alive 2007 list.

He was a guest on a 2009 episode of Late Night with Jimmy Fallon; a Top Ten List presenter on a 2009 episode of Late Show with David Letterman; a guest judge on Project Runway: All Stars in 2012; and appeared on Fashion Police in 2013.

On March 4, 2014, he was announced as one of the celebrities who will take part in the 18th season of Dancing with the Stars. He partnered with Karina Smirnoff. The two were the second couple to be eliminated on week 2 after a double elimination.

He appeared in two movies starring Mark Wahlberg and directed by Peter Berg: 2016's Patriots Day and 2018's Mile 22.

In January 2020, Avery announced he was cast in Christopher Nolans film Tenet.

In 2021, he appeared in S01E06 of the AMC Series Kevin Can F**k Himself as himself.

He has appeared multiple times in 2021–22 as a guest commentator on the Gutfeld! show on Fox News.

Book
Avery's memoir, Ice Capades: A Memoir of Fast Living and Tough Hockey (titled Offside: My Life Crossing the Line in Canada), was published by Blue Rider Press on October 24, 2017.

Restaurants
Avery had financial interest in two New York City restaurants in the early 2010s. In August 2013, the New York Post reported that Avery had sold his interests in both Warren 77 and Tiny's. According to sources, "For the betterment of the business, they paid him to go away. He got bought out".

Activism

Political endorsements 
On August 29, 2021, Avery, via Twitter, endorsed Republican Curtis Sliwa for Mayor of New York City.

Same-sex marriage
In May 2011, Avery recorded a video for the New Yorkers for Marriage Equality campaign, in support of same-sex marriage. In an interview with the New York Times, he stated, "I certainly have been surrounded by the gay community. And living in New York and when you live in L.A., you certainly have a lot of gay friends." Avery also travelled to Albany, New York, to lobby politicians prior to the July 2011 legalization of same-sex marriage in New York State.

Athlete Ally
In 2012, Avery was a member the board of directors of Athlete Ally. As of 2013, he is no longer associated with the group.

Lockdowns

In August 2020, during the Covid-19 lockdowns, Avery called for an end to lockdown restrictions using his Twitter account, claiming that the cost of the restrictions in human lives outweighed the lives saved by their implementation.

Personal life
Avery married model Hilary Rhoda at the Parrish Art Museum in New York on October 10, 2015. The couple had been engaged since November 8, 2013. The two first met at Warren 77 in the summer of 2009. The couple had been publicly estranged from Rhoda's mother for several years.

Avery and Rhoda have a son, Nash Hollis Avery, born on July 28, 2020.

Rhoda filed for divorce from Avery in July 2022.

Career statistics
Bold indicates led league

Transactions
 January 11, 1999 – Traded to Kingston (OHL) by Owen Sound (OHL) with Steve Lafleur for Aaron Fransen and D. J. Maracle.
 September 21, 1999 – Signed as a free agent with the Detroit Red Wings.
 March 11, 2003 – Traded by the Red Wings, along with Maxim Kuznetsov, Detroit's 2003 first-round draft choice and 2004 second-round draft choice, to the Los Angeles Kings in exchange for Mathieu Schneider.
 November 24, 2004 – Signed as a free agent by Lahti (Finland).
 February 11, 2005 – Signed as a free agent by Motor City (UHL).
 February 5, 2007 – Traded by the Kings, along with John Seymour, to the New York Rangers in exchange for Jason Ward, Jan Marek, Marc-André Cliche and New York's 2008 third-round draft choice.
 July 2, 2008 – Signed as a free agent with the Dallas Stars.
 March 3, 2009 – Claimed off re-entry waivers by the Rangers.
 October 11, 2011 – Sent down to the Connecticut Whale (AHL).
 October 31, 2011 – Placed on 24-hour re-entry waivers.
 March 12, 2012 – Announces retirement.

References

External links
 
 

1980 births
Canadian advertising executives
Businesspeople from Toronto
Canadian expatriate ice hockey players in Finland
Canadian ice hockey centres
Canadian male models
Canadian restaurateurs
Connecticut Whale (AHL) players
Dallas Stars players
Detroit Red Wings players
Grand Rapids Griffins players
Hartford Wolf Pack players
Kingston Frontenacs players
Lahti Pelicans players
Canadian LGBT rights activists
Living people
Los Angeles Kings players
Manchester Monarchs (AHL) players
Motor City Mechanics players
New York Rangers players
Owen Sound Platers players
Sportspeople from North York
Ice hockey people from Toronto
Undrafted National Hockey League players